Carinotetraodon borneensis, sometimes known as the Bornean red-eye puffer, is a species of pufferfish in the family Tetraodontidae. It is a tropical freshwater species known only from southern Sarawak, Malaysia. It reaches 4.4 cm (1.7 inches) SL and is sometimes seen in the aquarium trade.

References 

borneensis
Freshwater fish of Malaysia
Fish described in 1903